William Arthur Ganfield (September 3, 1873, in Dubuque County, Iowa – October 18, 1940, in Wisconsin) was a figure in American higher education and served as president of Centre College in Danville, Kentucky from 1915 to 1921 and later president of Carroll College (now called Carroll University) from 1921 until his retirement in 1939.

Ganfield was a supporter of athletic programs at both schools. He was president at Centre College during the school's 1921 Centre vs. Harvard football game, when Centre scored a victorious upset over national favorite Harvard University. As of 2006, the game is still considered by ESPN as one of the greatest college football upset victories of all time.

Ganfield continued his support of football as college president at Carroll.  He boasted that within four years' time the school would be beating the Wisconsin Badgers in football. In his first year as college president, the team fell far short of that mark with one win for the season and was outscored by 119 to 14, leaving fans and the school administration sorely disappointed under head coach C.C. Boone.  By 1925, the school had a perfect 8–0 season under head coach Norris Armstrong. , the school has never played the "Badgers" in football.

References

1873 births
1940 deaths
People from Dubuque County, Iowa
People from Danville, Kentucky
People from Waukesha, Wisconsin
Presidents of Centre College
Carroll University